Robert Atkins may refer to:

 Robert Atkins (physician) (1930–2003), American physician noted for the Atkins diet
 Robert Atkins (actor) (1886–1972), British film and theatre actor
 Robert Atkins (politician) (born 1946), UK Conservative Party politician
 Robert Atkins (comics) (born 1979), American comics artist
 Bob Atkins (born 1962), English footballer
 Bob Atkins (American football) (1946–2020), American football player

See also
Robert Atkyns (disambiguation)